The Cesca chair is a chair design created in 1928 by the Hungarian-American architect and designer Marcel Breuer. It consists of a tubular steel frame and a rattan seat and backing. The design was named as a tribute to Breuer’s adopted daughter Francesca (nicknamed Cesca). One of the original chairs designed by Breuer is held by the Metropolitan Museum of Art in New York.

The design was purchased in 1968 by Knoll Associates. Since then, approximately 250,000 of the chairs have been purchased. The three official manufacturers of the chair were Thonet (from 1927), Gavina (1950s), and Knoll (1960s).

In 1928, the Cesca chair was the first such tubular-steel-frame, caned-seat chair to be mass-produced. It was among the ten most common such chairs. One of the original ones from that time sits in the Museum of Modern Art in Manhattan. Cara McCarty, a curator at the museum, referred to the chair as being "among the 10 most important chairs of the 20th century".

References

1928 in art
Chairs
1928 introductions
Industrial design
Marcel Breuer furniture